Prelude FLNG is a floating liquefied natural gas platform owned by Shell plc and built by the Technip–Samsung Consortium (TSC) in South Korea for a joint venture between Royal Dutch Shell, KOGAS, and Inpex. The hull was launched in December 2013.

It is the world's largest floating liquefied natural gas platform as well as the largest offshore facility ever constructed.

Construction
The main double-hulled structure was built by the Technip Samsung Consortium in the Samsung Heavy Industries Geoje shipyard in South Korea. Construction was officially started when the first metal was cut for the substructure in October 2012. The Turret Mooring System has been subcontracted to SBM and has been built in Drydocks World Dubai, United Arab Emirates. The MEG reclamation unit by Fjords Processing Norway and built in South Korea is the only topside module subcontracted. Other equipment such as subsea wellheads are being constructed in other places around the world. It was launched on 30 November 2013 with no superstructure (accommodation and process plant).

The vessel is moored by its turret to 16 seabed driven steel piles, each 65 meters long and 5.5 meters in diameter.

Subsea equipment is being built by FMC Technologies, and Emerson is the main supplier of automation systems and uninterruptible power supply systems. By July 2015, all 14 gas plant modules were installed.

Cost and funding
Prelude FLNG was approved for funding by Shell in 2011.

Competitive pressures from an increase in the long-term production capabilities of North American gas fields due to hydraulic fracturing technologies and increasing Russian export capabilities may reduce the actual profitability of the venture from what was anticipated in 2011. In 2021 the WAToday news website reported that it was believed that the ship had cost at least , though Shell has never confirmed the actual cost.

Operations
The system has a planned life expectancy of 25 years. The Prelude and Concerto fields are expected to produce 5.3 million tonnes of liquid and condensate per year; this includes 3.6 million tonnes of liquified natural gas, 1.3 million tonnes of condensate, and 400,000 tonnes of liquified petroleum gas.

The ability to produce and offload LNG to large LNG carriers is an important innovation, which reduces costs and removes the need for long pipelines to land-based LNG processing plants. However, fitting all the equipment onto a single floating facility was a significant challenge.

The system is designed to withstand Category 5 cyclones, although workers may be evacuated before that on an EC225 rescue helicopter. According to plans, it will produce 110,000 BOE per day.

It was expected to become operational in 2018. On 26 December 2018, Royal Dutch Shell announced that initial production had begun at Prelude. Shell said that wells had been opened and that the start-up and ramp-up phases were underway.

Prelude was shut down in February 2020 after a reported electrical problem. The platform had previously suffered two incidents that saw the unintended release of gas, which NOPSEMA described as "dangerous". It restarted production in January 2021.

The ship's electrical supply was disrupted by a small fire on 2 December 2021. This led to the cessation of production and the evacuation of most of the crew.

As a result of repeated environmental and safety mishaps, NOPSEMA ordered the supermajor to not resume production for an indefinite period of time, pending Shell's ability to prove updated practices.  According to NOPSEMA, Shell "did not have a sufficient understanding of the risks of the power system on the facility, including failure mechanisms, interdependencies, and recovery", adding that "power loss directly impacted critical safety systems along with the ability to safely evacuate crew by boat or helicopter."

In April 2022 the vessel resumed operations. Operations were again partially stopped and then fully stopped during a strike which lasted 11 weeks until 25 August 2022.

A Lego model of Prelude was built for a Shell trade show in 2014. Nearly 5 meters long, the model currently resides in the foyer of Shell's Perth head office.

References

External links

Shell plc
Liquefied natural gas
Natural gas platforms
Floating production storage and offloading vessels
Ships built by Samsung Heavy Industries